The dottybacks are a family, Pseudochromidae, of fishes which were formerly classified in the order Perciformes, but this has been revised and the family is regarded as of uncertain affinities, or incertae sedis within the Ovalentaria, a clade within the Percomorpha. Around 152 species belong to this family.

They are found in the tropical and subtropical Indo-Pacific, where most inhabit coral reefs. Many species are brightly coloured fish, often showing striking sexual dimorphism. Dottybacks are distinguished from other families by the presence of three or less spines in the dorsal fin and an incomplete lateral line organ.

Several of the brightly coloured members of the family are often seen in the marine aquarium trade, although some species are aggressively territorial.

Genera
Family Pseudochromidae
 Subfamily Anisochrominae
 Anisochromis
 Subfamily Congrogadinae - eel blennies 
Blennodesmus
Congrogadus
Halidesmus
Halimuraena
Halimuraenoides
Haliophis
Natalichthys
Rusichthys
 Subfamily Pseudochrominae
Assiculoides
Assiculus
Cypho
Labracinus
Manonichthys
Ogilbyina
Oxycercichthys
Pholidochromis
Pictichromis
Pseudochromis
 Subfamily Pseudoplesiopinae
Amsichthys
Chlidichthys
Chlidichthys inornatus
Lubbockichthys
Pectinochromis
Pseudoplesiops

Timeline

References 

 
Ovalentaria